The Constellation Energy League was an independent baseball league that operated in Texas during 2020 because of COVID-19 restrictions limiting travel, and as a way to create opportunities for minor league players.

History
The league consisted of four teams, each managed by a former Major League Baseball (MLB) player:

The teams were made up of former MLB players as well as other minor league and independent professional players. Each team was scheduled to play 28 games, including seven-inning doubleheaders every weekend.  The league's season was planned to begin on July 3, but was pushed back to July 10 due to a spike in COVID-19 cases. Even with the delay, the league began play two weeks before the start of the 2020 MLB season.

All games were played at Constellation Field in Sugar Land, Texas. Parking was included with ticket prices to limit staff and fan interactions and up to 1800 ticket-holders were seated in a socially distanced fashion within the 7500-seat stadium. No games were canceled due to COVID-19 cases, and the league operated for five weeks without any positive COVID-19 test results. Players received $1600 per month, with exposure to MLB teams being the main reason for playing; at least five players in the league were subsequently added to MLB rosters.

Results and honors
The Sugar Land Skeeters finished with the best record in the four-team league. A most-valuable player (MVP) was named for each team.

An all-star team was also named:

Notes

References

Defunct independent baseball leagues in the United States
Baseball leagues in Texas
Impact of the COVID-19 pandemic on baseball
Sugar Land, Texas
2020 establishments in Texas
2020 disestablishments in Texas